Semonides of Amorgos (variantly ; fl. 7th century BC) was a Greek iambic and elegiac poet who is believed to have lived during the seventh century BC. Fragments of his poetry survive as quotations in other ancient authors, the most extensive and well known of which is a satiric account of different types of women which is often cited in discussions of misogyny in Archaic Greece. The poem takes the form of a catalogue, with each type of woman represented by an animal whose characteristics—in the poet's scheme—are also characteristic of a large body of the female population. 

Other fragments belong to the registers of gnomic poetry and wisdom literature in which the Hesiodic Works and Days and the Theognidea are classed, and reflect a similarly pessimistic view of the human experience. There is also evidence that Semonides composed the sort of personal invective found in the work of his near contemporary iambographer Archilochus and the later Hipponax, but no surviving fragment can be securely attributed to such a poem.

Name and biography
The name "Semonides" (Sēmōnídes) is attested by an entry transmitted in two ancient lexica—the Etymologicum Genuinum and Etymologicum Magnum—which apparently had Choeroboscus as its immediate source:

Simonides: in the case of the iambic poet is written with an eta, as in "sign" (sēma); the name of the lyric poet is written with an iota, as in "snub-nosed" (sīmos). — Choeroboscus

The lyric poet mentioned herein is Simonides of Ceos (6th–5th centuries BC). Despite the testimony of the etymologica, every source that quotes the iambic poet spells his name identically with that of his more famous namesake, and the only other author who uses the form "Semonides" is Philodemus. Whatever the poet's name actually was, modern scholarship has adopted Choeroboscus' distinction between the two forms as a means of distinguishing the two poets. Still, the homophony of their names in ancient quotations leaves open the possibility that some fragments attributed to Simonides might actually belong to Semonides.

Two notices in the tenth-century encyclopedia known as the Suda provide most of the extant details of Semonides' life. His primary lemma reads: "Simonides [sic], son of Crines, of Amorgos, iambic writer. He wrote elegiac poetry in two books and iambics. He was born 490 years after the Trojan War [i.e. 693 BC]. He was the first to write iambics according to some." Further information has been conflated with the entry on Simmias of Rhodes; the relevant portion is:

Other contradictory dates for Semonides' birth or floruit are found in the chronographic tradition relying upon Eusebius' Chronicon (Olympiad 29.1 = 664 BC), Cyril of Alexandria (29th Olympiad = 664–661), and Clement of Alexandria (20th Olympiad = 700–697). Semonides' role in the colonisation of Amorgos and his identification as a contemporary of Archilochus in the ancient testimonia recommend accepting the later dates of Eusebius and Cyril, and today he is almost universally considered to have lived in the middle and latter half of the seventh century. 

Based upon a perceived allusion to Archilochus at Semonides  7.51–2 some have refined the chronology further, arguing that Semonides either lived after Archilochus or was his younger contemporary. If the Sudas testimony that Semonides participated in the colonization of Amorgos is true, he likely had a political career similar to that of Archilochus, who was among the colonists of Thasos.

Poetry
Although the Suda states that Semonides composed elegy as well iambus, none of his elegiac poetry has survived. If the encyclopedia's information is to be trusted, it is probable that the first entry's "elegiac poetry in two books" refers to the Early History of Samos in the second. This work would belong to the genre of ktisis ("foundation") poetry which Mimnermus' elegiac Smyrneis might also have represented.

Semonides' poetry, as is the case with archaic elegy and iambus in general, is composed in a literary Ionic dialect largely reminiscent of Homeric Greek and occasionally includes echoes of Homeric and Hesiodic poetry. The extant fragments are written in iambic trimeters, a stichic verse form also employed by Archilochus which would later be the primary meter of dialogue in tragedy. To judge from the admittedly small sample of his work, Semonides was a conservative metrician: in 180 lines there is not a single certain instance of resolution.

Editions, translations and commentaries
 . — Text and commentary on select fragments.
 . — Critical edition of the Greek.
 . — Translation with facing Greek text,
 . — Translation with Greek text and commentary.
 . — Commentary keyed to the text of Diehl.
 .
 .
 . — Critical edition of the Greek.

References

Sources
 .
 .
 .
 .
 .
 .
 .
 .
 .
 .
 .

External links
Translation and notes on Poem 7 by Diane Arnson Svarlien at Diotíma

7th-century BC Greek people
7th-century BC poets
Ancient Greek poets
Ancient Samians
Amorgos
Iambic poets
Ionic Greek poets